Tugboat Granny is a 1956 Warner Bros. Merrie Melodies cartoon animated short directed by Friz Freleng. The short was released on June 23, 1956, and stars Tweety and Sylvester the Cat.

The voices were performed by Mel Blanc and June Foray.

The cartoon's title is a play on Tugboat Annie, and is the only cartoon in the Warner Bros. series to bear Granny's name.

It joined Guided Muscle and The Grey Hounded Hare as the cartoons featured on the final episode of ABC's The Bugs Bunny & Tweety Show on September 2, 2000.

Plot
In the opening scene, Granny and Tweety are happily piloting a rented tugboat in a harbor, singing a kiddie-song duet about the carefree joys of their activity. It is the only scene in which Granny appears, as the rest of the cartoon is devoted to Sylvester's latest attempts to catch and eat Tweety, which begins when, after failing to grab a fish by hiding in a fisherman's basket (the fisherman caught a crab instead, which Sylvester gets attacked by), he sees the boat carrying the canary chug past.

Sylvester's attempts, all unsuccessful, include the following:
 Using a wooden rowboat to get to the tug. Tweety drops anchor in the boat's hull, sinking Sylvester (though he comes out onto the beach without the boat but still rowing with the oars).
 Using an inflatable raft, which is deflated by a dart thrown by Tweety ("Hey, puddy tat! Wook what I found! Here, you can have it!"), sinking Sylvester once again.
 Attempting to jump off a bridge, which is mistimed, as Sylvester lands inside the smokestack, leaving him frantically trying to put out his now-on fire backside.
 A follow-up attempt from another bridge to parachute onto the boat's deck ("Oh, that bad ol' puddy tat! He never give up!") results in a jammed pack, which only opens after Sylvester sinks to the bottom of the river ("Aww, the poor puddy tat. Got himself all soaking wet."). He subsequently uses a pipe as a snorkel to walk on the sea floor to the boat. Unfortunately, a seagull finds Sylvester's pipe the perfect resting place, blocking the airway making Sylvester unable to breathe and turning him blue; gasping for air the cat rushes back to shore, he starts panting and finds the seagull laid an egg in his mouth. The frightened seagull flees as Sylvester angrily throws the egg at it; he misses and the egg hits him in the face.
 Driving a motorboat, but Sylvester instead goes into the rapids and over a waterfall. All the time, the motor fails to start, and when it does, Sylvester pounds it to submission.
 A lasso ("That puddy tat think he a cowboy!"), which instead grabs the antenna of a speedboat. Sylvester decides to show off several waterskiing tricks ... until the inattentive puddy smashes into a pole. As he floats upside-down, a fish gurgles Tweety's signature line: "I tawt I taw a puddy tat." The cartoon ends just after Sylvester fails to grab the fish.

References

External links
 
 Nuance and Suggestion in the Tweety and Sylvester Series - Written by Kevin McCorry

1956 animated films
Merrie Melodies short films
Short films directed by Friz Freleng
1950s Warner Bros. animated short films
Films scored by Milt Franklyn
1956 short films
Animated films about cats
Animated films about birds
Tweety films
Sylvester the Cat films
Films produced by Edward Selzer
Films set on boats
1950s English-language films
American animated short films